The Welder is a 2021 American horror film directed by David Liz, who also co-wrote the film with Manuel Delgadillo. Its plot follows an interracial couple who, while on vacation at a ranch near the Everglades, encounter a former surgeon intent on conducting grisly racial experiments.

The Welder premiered at the Popcorn Frights Film Festival on August 15, 2021. It was released on video-on-demand (VOD) and digital platforms on February 24, 2023.

Cast
 Camila Rodríguez as Eliza, a Latina woman and former army medic
 Roe Dunkley as Roe, an African American man and Eliza's boyfriend
 Vincent De Paul as William Godwin
 Anthony Vazquez as Duke
 Jorge Picó

Production
The Welder was shot on location in Homestead, Florida.

Release and reception
The Welder had its world premiere at the Popcorn Frights Film Festival in Florida on August 15, 2021. The film was released on video-on-demand (VOD) and digital platforms on February 24, 2023.

Matthew Dupée of Rue Morgue gave the film a mostly negative review, writing that, "from a preposterous premise to its flawed execution, the film curdles its noble intention of taking on social ills like racism and mental health issues."

References

External links
 

2021 horror films
American horror films
Films about interracial romance
Films about racism in the United States
Mad scientist films
Films set in Florida
Films shot in Florida